Deepa Parab (born 31 October 1974) is an Marathi and Hindi film and television actress. She currently appears in the television showTu Chal Pudha as Ashwini Waghmare.

Acting career
She has appeared in Marathi films and serials.

In 2020-2021, she played the role of Aastha Kashyap Sabherwal in StarPlus's Shaurya Aur Anokhi Ki Kahani.

Since August 2022, she is playing the lead role of Ashwini Shreyas Waghmare Zee Marathi's show Tu Chal Pudha

Personal life
She is married to Ankush Chaudhari.

Filmography

Films

Television

References

External links
 

Living people
Indian soap opera actresses
Actresses in Marathi cinema
Indian women comedians
Actresses in Marathi theatre
1974 births